My Monopoly is a service offered to citizens of the United Kingdom by the company Hasbro. The service was designed to allow a user of the My Monopoly website to create a personalized Monopoly gameset, which can then be ordered and made for that person. The service was developed by Monitor Media Ltd and introduced in 2002. There were two versions of My Monopoly: the Traditional version; and the Here & Now version, which was introduced in 2005 and discontinued in 2006.

Traditional version 

In the  Traditional version of the service, the customer uses a closet facility on the website to type new property names over the original ones. All squares on the board can be edited with the exception of Go, the Jail square, Free Parking, Go to Jail, Electric Company, Water Works, Chance, Community Chest, Super Tax and Income Tax. Obscenities and trademarks may not be entered. After personalizing the property squares around the board, the customer can then order their board. The gameset includes the personalized gameboard, 1 pack of standard Monopoly money, 10 movers, 2 dice, 16 personalized Chance cards, 16 personalized Community Chest cards and 28 personalized Title Deeds. The game comes in a deluxe presentation tin with a colour label affixed which has custom text printed, and the tin itself is embossed with the Monopoly logo and Rich Uncle Pennybags.

Here & Now version 

This version was introduced in 2005, alongside the introduction of the Monopoly Here & Now Limited Edition. In this version the customer chooses to replace each property with one from an extensive list of properties in England. They can also fully personalize the four property spaces around Go. The customer must purchase either the Monopoly Here & Now Limited Edition or the Monopoly Here & Now Electronic Edition before ordering their My Monopoly set. The gameset includes the personalized board, 28 Title Deeds, 16 Chance cards and 16 Community Chest cards. When the customer receives their My Monopoly set they should replace the board, title deeds and Chance and Community Chest cards in their standard Here & Now edition with the ones from the My Monopoly set. This version of My Monopoly was discontinued in 2006.

Corporate version—Winning Moves 

For companies who wish to create their own edition of Monopoly, Hasbro offer a service through their partner Winning Moves Custom Games. Rather than an individual game, Winning Moves create custom editions of Monopoly at quantities suitable for corporate use; changing the box, board, cards and images to match them to a corporate identity. The games are typically used to celebrate a corporate anniversary or as a gift to employees or clients. In the United Kingdom, companies with their own edition include Thomas Cook, Virgin Money and Wrigley.

External links 
My Monopoly website
Hasbro.com
Official Monopoly website
Winning Moves Custom Games 
My Monopoly Review

Monopoly (game)
2002 introductions